Luke Gerald Dillon, 4th Baron Clonbrock KP PC (Ire) (10 March 1834 – 12 May 1917) was an Irish peer.

In 1865, he was appointed High Sheriff of County Galway. He became Baron Clonbrock in 1893 on the death of his father Robert Dillon, 3rd Baron Clonbrock and was appointed a Knight of the Order of St Patrick on 29 August 1900.

He married Augusta Caroline Crofton, daughter of Edward Crofton, 2nd Baron Crofton of Mote and Lady Georgina Paget, on 18 July 1866 at Roscommon, County Roscommon, Ireland. As a result of her marriage, Hon. Augusta Caroline Crofton was styled as Baroness Clonbrock on 4 December 1893.

The finding aid of the collection related to the personal and political papers of the family of Dillon, Barons Clonbrock, Ahascragh (county Galway, c.1600-1960) was compiled by Stephen Ball, at the National Library of Ireland.

References

1834 births
1917 deaths
19th-century Irish people
Barons in the Peerage of Ireland
High Sheriffs of County Galway
Irish representative peers
Knights of St Patrick
Lord-Lieutenants of Galway
Members of the Privy Council of Ireland
Dillon, 4th Baron Clonbrock, Luke